Vyacheslav Ivanovich Silin (1907—1975) was a leading weapons engineer in the Soviet Union.

Biography 

Silin was born in Tula on February 22, 1907. In 1919, he began working at the Tula Arms Plant. His work was halted while he served in the Red Army from 1931-1932, but throughout the rest of his life, he was a leading figure in the engineering and construction of military technology for the Soviet Union. He was awarded the Order of Lenin in 1939 and the Lenin Prize in 1967. He died on November 20, 1975.

Technology produced 

Silin produced several important weapons for the USSR, both through his engineering work and under his direction. Working at the Central Bureau for the Construction and Research of Recreational and Hunting Weapons in Tula, he was tasked with developing antitank grenade launchers and was directly involved in the creation of the main weapons for the BMP-1 and BMD - 2A28 gun. In 1935, his involvement with the project led to the development of the 7.62  mm rapid-fire aircraft machine gun Sibemas (VI Silin, M. E. Berezin, P. Morozenko) with a rate of fire of 6,000 rounds/min which also features revolving scheme automation. Work on the design of such weapons was halted in the late 1940s, due to shortcomings in the design.

In 1939 Silin participated in a competition to create a 7.62-mm machine gun. He developed the TCB-67 machine gun, which successfully passed field testing. Silin participated in the design of the VYa-23 and B-20 air cannons. In the late 40s - early 50s VI Silin developed the TKB-440 tank gun, equipped with a 7.62-mm rifle cartridge, as well as the TKB-458M with a 7,62  mm cartridge arr. 1943 In the 1950s. Silin was tested on a revolving scheme, 23-mm cannon TKB-505, and 30-mm gun TKB-515.

As chief designer at the Central Bureau in Tula from 1960 until his death, Silin spearheaded the development of anti-tank grenade launchers. In 1960-1963. he, together with AT Alekseev developed the SPG-9 73-mm heavy machine grenade launcher, which is significantly faster than the best modern foreign models of similar value. In 1961-1966, Silin, together with VI Zaitsev, NS Pasenko, and VI Volkov, developed a brand new 73-mm smoothbore semi-2A28 gun. For his work, Silin was awarded the Order of Lenin, the Order of the Patriotic War II degree, and two Orders of Red Banner of Labour.

External links
 Silin gun
 Vyacheslav Ivanovich Silin

Firearm designers
Soviet engineers
Soviet military personnel of World War II
Weapons scientists and engineers
1907 births
1975 deaths